Luxembourg competed at the 2015 European Games, in Baku, Azerbaijan from 12 to 28 June 2015.

Archery

Athletics

Luxembourg has qualified 50 athletes.

 Mixed team – 1 team of 50 athletes

Cycling

Luxembourg has qualified 6 athletes.

 Men's road race – 3 quota places
 Men's time trial – 1 quota place
 Women's road race – 2 quota places
 Women's time trial – 1 quota place
 Men's cross-country – 1 quota place

Fencing

Luxembourg has qualified 1 athlete.

 Women's individual épée – 1 quota place

Gymnastics

Luxembourg has qualified 1 athlete.

Artistic
 Women's individual – 1 quota place

Karate

Luxembourg has qualified 1 athlete.

 Women's −55kg – 1 quota place

Shooting

Luxembourg has qualified 1 athlete.

 Men's trap – 1 quota place

Table tennis

Luxembourg has qualified 3 athletes.

 Women's singles – 2 quota places
 Women's team – 1 team of 3 athletes

Triathlon

Luxembourg has qualified 1 athlete.

 Men's – Bob Haller

References

Nations at the 2015 European Games
European Games
Luxembourg at the European Games